Reginald Sherriff Summerhays (often known as R. S. Summerhays) was a British expert and author in equine matters.

Biography

At the age of 32 in 1914, he was appointed by the British War Office as a Civilian Remount Purchasing Officer, with the duty of purchasing horses for World War I. Later he served as part of the Army Service Corps. In the early 1920s he rode in the three horse endurance tests of  a day for five consecutive days. He then became Managing Director of one of the largest hunting, hacking and pony establishments in the country. Later he became editor of the journal Riding, retiring after thirteen years. It was then he published the first of his equine titles.

Other Interests

For over 40 years Summerhays was a horse show judge as well as serving on the boards of many horse breeding societies. He was also president of the Arab Horse Society. His interests included polo. He was the originator of the Horseman's Sunday and also of the Horse and Pony Breeding and Benefit Fund.

Bibliography

 Here's Horse Sense
 From Saddle to Fireside
 Elements of Riding
 Elements of Hunting
 Riding For All
 Observer's Book of Horses and Ponies
 The Problem Horse
 It's A Good Life With Horses
 Summerhays' Encyclopedia for Horsemen
 Our Horses Horses and Ponies
 Riding on a Small Income
 The Story of the International
 The Young Rider's Guide to the Horse World
 A Lifetime with Horses
 Arabian Horse in Great Britain (1967), London, Country Life Ltd.
 The Arabian Horse (1974)  A.S. Barnes,  
In Praise of the Arabian Horse  (1954) coauthor with Staveacre F. W. F. The Arab Horse Society & J A Allen ASIN: B000WI33ZY
 The Courthouse Arabian Stud (1966) H.V. Musgrave Clark; Rev edition

Footnotes

English male equestrians
1976 deaths
British Army personnel of World War I
Year of birth missing
Royal Army Service Corps soldiers